The 2017 Red Rooster Sydney SuperSprint was a motor racing event for the Supercars Championship, held on the weekend of 18 to 20 August 2017. The event was held at Sydney Motorsport Park in Eastern Creek, New South Wales and consisted of two races, 120 and 200 kilometres in length. It is the ninth event of fourteen in the 2017 Supercars Championship and hosted Races 17 and 18 of the season.

References

Sydney SuperSprint
Sydney SuperSprint